Thomas Lee Dummer ( – 6 October 1765) was an English Member of Parliament for Southampton (1737–1741) and Newport (Isle of Wight) (1765–1768).

Family
Dummer's uncle, Edmund Dummer (1663–1724), was a lawyer who was appointed a Clerk of the Great Wardrobe under Queen Anne in 1706, holding that office until 1721. His father, Thomas, was appointed as Yeoman Tailor and Portitior in 1706 and Deputy Master the following year.

Appointments
On 7 December 1721, Dummer was appointed jointly with J. Baynes as Clerk of the Great Wardrobe to King George I, succeeding his uncle.

In 1730, Dummer became Lord of the Manor at Horninghold in Leicestershire.

In March 1732, Dummer was elected a Fellow of the Royal Society

Political career
In 1737, Dummer succeeded John Conduitt as MP for Southampton on the latter's death. Conduitt had left a daughter, Catherine, whose guardians sold the estate at Cranbury Park near Winchester to Dummer, as well as estates at Weston and Netley, near Southampton.

Dummer continued to represent Southampton for four years until the 1741 election. In 1747, he was elected as MP for Newport on the Isle of Wight and continued to represent that town until his death in 1765. On his death, his estates were left to his son, Thomas (1739–1781), who also succeeded him as MP for Newport.

References

Sources

External links
The Family of Dummer of British Origin
The families of Dummer

1712 births
1765 deaths
Members of Parliament for Newport (Isle of Wight)
British MPs 1734–1741
British MPs 1741–1747
British MPs 1747–1754
British MPs 1754–1761
British MPs 1761–1768
Fellows of the Royal Society